Rick Altman is a professor of Cinema and Comparative Literature in the Department of Cinema and Comparative Literature, University of Iowa, Iowa City, United States. He has also published under the name Charles F. Altman.

References

University of Iowa faculty
Year of birth missing (living people)
Living people